Bekabad is a district of Tashkent Region in Uzbekistan. The capital lies at the town Zafar.

Settlements 
The district consists of 5 urban-type settlements (Zafar, Bobur, Koʻrkam, Xos, Gulzor) and 12 rural communities (Moʻyinqum, Bahoriston, Bekobod, Dalvarzin, Guliston, Madaniyat, Jumabozor, Qiyot, Mehnatobod, Yangiqoʻrgʻon, Chanoq, Yangi hayot).

Population 

The population is mainly ethnic Uzbeks, as well as Tatars, Tajiks and representatives of other nationalities. The population density is 210 people per km2. The urban population is 29 thousand people, the rural population is 30.5 thousand people (2021).

References

Districts of Uzbekistan
Tashkent Region